The Rose and Crown is a 1956 Australian television play.

Plot
The Rose and Crown is a London pub. Five regulars are confronted one evening by an unusual request from a stranger, the personification of death.

Cast
Edward   Howell   
Ethel   Lang as Ma Peck   
Lou   Vernon  
David   Butler as Harry

Production
Priestley had written the piece specifically for television.

It was broadcast live in Sydney.

1963 Perth Version

A version of the play was performed in Perth in 1963, the first television drama made in that city. It was broadcast in Melbourne on 9 September 1963.

The producer was Bill Eldridge who described the play as "something between the kitchen sink and the twilight zone, one of Priestley's 'time' plays concerned with the reaction of ordinary people to an extraordinary situation."

Cast
Nita Pannell as the hard drinking widow Mrs Reed
Michael Laurence as Percy Randle, newlywed
Jan Shier as Ivy Randle, newlywed
Chris Pendlebury as Ma Peck
Ron Graham as Harry Tully
Peter Collingwood as the plumber
Paul Nayton as the mysterious stranger

See also
List of live television plays broadcast on Australian Broadcasting Corporation (1950s)

References

External links

1957 television plays
Australian Broadcasting Corporation original programming
English-language television shows
Black-and-white Australian television shows
Australian live television shows
1950s Australian television plays
1960s Australian television plays